Sir Thomas Crisp English, born Thomas Johnston English, KCMG (22 July 1878 - 25 August 1949) was a British surgeon at St George's Hospital, and consulting surgeon to Queen Alexandra Military Hospital, Millbank, the Royal Hospital Chelsea, and to King Edward VII's Hospital for Officers.

References 

1878 births
1949 deaths
Knights Grand Cross of the Order of St Michael and St George
British surgeons